Otocinclus macrospilus is a species of catfish in the family Loricariidae. It is native to South America, where it is known from the Amazon River basin. The species reaches 3.5 cm (1.4 inches) SL and is found in the aquarium trade, where it is sometimes referred to as the common otocinclus or dwarf otocinclus, both of which can lead to confusion with other Otocinclus and Macrotocinclus species.

References 

Hypoptopomatini
Fish described in 1942